Ashlee Bond (born April 15, 1985) is an American-Israeli show jumping rider who competes for Israel. She has qualified to represent Israel at the 2020 Summer Olympics in Tokyo.

Early life
Her father is Steve Bond (né Shlomo Goldberg). He was born and raised in Haifa, Israel, and moved to the United States when he was 12 years old. Her mother, Cindy, is a filmmaker, and she has one younger sibling, her brother Dylan.

Riding career
Bond began competing at the age of six, won her first grand prix at age 16, and in 2001 was named Grand Prix Rookie Rider of the Year by both the United States Equestrian Federation (USEF) and the Pacific Coast Horse Association. In 2009, at 24, she was in the top 40 in the FEI World Rankings, was No. 2 on the Rolex/USEF Show Jumping Rankings, and was named "Chronicle of the Horse" Show Jumping Horseman of the Year.

Between 2009 and 2014, Bond won the 2009 CHIO Aachen, 2014 HITS $1 Million Grand Prix, and an FEI Nations Cup. She won the $100,000 Longines FEI World Cup Jumping title at Thermal, California, in 2016, and the $100,000 Longines FEI World Cup Qualifier at the HITS Coachella Desert Circuit in 2017.

She has qualified to represent Israel at the 2020 Summer Olympics in Tokyo. In July 2019 Team Israel's Bond, Daniel Bluman, Elad Yaniv, and Danielle Goldstein won the Olympic Jumping Qualifier at Maxima Park in Moscow, qualifying for the Tokyo Olympics, the first time that Israel has earned a place in the Olympics in equestrian.

In July 2019 she announced the retirement of her top horse, Chela LS. Bond has considered riding her horse Donnie in the Olympics.

Personal life
Bond married Roy Meeus, now a Belgian former professional football player, in 2015 and they have a daughter named Scottie, born in 2016.

Bond is a Christian, although her father is Jewish. She became an Israeli citizen in 2018, and now rides and competes for Israel.

References

External links
 
 
 

Living people
American female equestrians
American show jumping riders
Israeli show jumping riders
Israeli female equestrians
1985 births
People from Haifa
Israeli Christians
Israeli people of Hungarian-Jewish descent
Israeli people of Romanian-Jewish descent
American Christians
American people of Israeli descent
American people of Hungarian-Jewish descent
American people of Romanian-Jewish descent
Equestrians at the 2020 Summer Olympics
Olympic equestrians of Israel
21st-century American women